The 2019 Tour du Haut Var was a road cycling stage race that took place from 22 to 24 February 2019. The race was rated as a 2.1 event as part of the 2019 UCI Europe Tour, and was the 51st edition of the Tour du Haut Var.

Teams
Eighteen teams were invited to start the race. These included four UCI WorldTeams, six UCI Professional Continental teams and seven UCI Continental teams.

Route

Stages

Stage 1
22 February 2019 — Vence to Mandelieu-la-Napoule,

Stage 2
23 February 2019 — Le Cannet-des-Maures to Mons,

Stage 3
24 February 2019 — La Londe-les-Maures to Mont Faron,

Classification leadership table
In the 2019 Tour du Haut Var, four different jerseys were awarded. For the general classification, calculated by adding each cyclist's finishing times on each stage, the leader received a yellow jersey. This classification was considered the most important of the 2019 Tour du Haut Var, and the winner of the classification was considered the winner of the race.

Additionally, there was a points classification, which awarded a green jersey. In the points classification, cyclists received points for finishing in the top 15 in a mass-start stage. For winning a stage, a rider earned 25 points, with 20 for second, 16 for third, 14 for fourth, 12 for fifth, 10 for sixth, then 1 point fewer per place down to 1 for 15th place. Points towards the classification could also be accrued at intermediate sprint points during each stage. There was also a mountains classification, the leadership of which was marked by a red jersey. In the mountains classification, points were won by reaching the top of a climb before other cyclists, with more points available for the higher-categorised climbs.

The fourth jersey represented the young rider classification, marked by a white jersey. This was decided in the same way as the general classification, but only riders born after 1 January 1995 were eligible to be ranked in the classification. There was also a classification for teams, in which the times of the best three cyclists per team on each stage were added together; the leading team at the end of the race was the team with the lowest total time.

References

External links

2019 UCI Europe Tour
2019 in French sport
2019